A wholly owned subsidiary of the Michelin Group, ViaMichelin designs, develops and markets digital travel assistance products and services for road users in Europe.

Launched in 2001 and drawing upon a century of Michelin experience in the publication of maps and guides, ViaMichelin provides services designed for both the general public and for business. The company uses its technological expertise to provide a complete service offering (maps, route plans, hotel and restaurant listings and traffic and tourist information, etc.), across a range of media including the Internet (www.viamichelin.co.uk), mobile phones, Personal Digital Assistants (PDAs) and GPS navigation systems, etc. ViaMichelin now employs 200 people and has locations in London, Frankfurt, Madrid, Milan and Paris.

ViaMichelin website 
The ViaMichelin website provides mapping coverage for 7 million kilometers of roads and streets across more than 42 European countries.

The website is available in many languages, and its on-line hotel reservations service features more than 60,000 hotels across Europe. Visitors to the site gain access to an exclusive database of Michelin Guide content and listings including 18,000 tourist site recommendations and ratings for 62,000 hotels and restaurants, as well as additional travel services including traffic and weather updates, on-line car-hire booking and a database of speed camera locations, updated regularly and available to download free of charge. The website also features an online store offering electronic updates of the Michelin Guide and a range of GPS accessories, as well as navigation-related software (SD cards, CD-ROMs etc.) designed for third-party GPS navigation devices and PDAs. ViaMichelin Labs is a website used to improve and test new products like Michelin iPhone-specific maps.

Mobile Services 
ViaMichelin services were available in the United Kingdom (02), France (Bouygues Telecom), Italy (Wind), Spain (Telefónica), Germany (E-Plus), Holland (Base) and Belgium via the i-mode portal. Users can access many services including automatic routing and travel-related address finder services (hotels, restaurants, petrol stations, etc.).
ViaMichelin Mobile services stopped offering mobile services in the beginning of 2007.

Software for PDAs 
ViaMichelin also develops navigation software designed for PDAs providing PDA users with direct access to ViaMichelin’s route calculation and map display services, as well as comprehensive Michelin guide listings.

Navigation for PDAs 
HP iPAQ rx1950 GPS Navigator / Tungsten E2 Navigation Companion / Palm TX GPS Navigation Companion

GPS Navigation 
In October 2005, ViaMichelin launched its own portable GPS navigation systems that included Michelin Guide content and a range of additional location-based content including shops, petrol stations, service stations and safety camera locations. ViaMichelin’s traffic information service was also available to vehicle manufacturers. On 11 January 2008 ViaMichelin took the decision to cease production of its GPS range in order to focus on its core activities and services.

External links
ViaMichelin
iOS App Store

Software companies established in 2001
Michelin brands
Mobile route-planning software
Web Map Services
Android (operating system) software
IOS software